In music, a loop is a repeating section of sound material. Short sections can be repeated to create ostinato patterns. Longer sections can also be repeated: for example, a player might loop what they play on an entire verse of a song in order to then play along with it, accompanying themselves.

Loops can be created using a wide range of music technologies including turntables, digital samplers, looper pedals, synthesizers, sequencers, drum machines, tape machines, and delay units, and they can be programmed using computer music software. The feature to loop a section of an audio track or video footage is also referred to by electronics vendors as A–B repeat.

Royalty-free loops can be purchased and downloaded for music creation from companies like The Loop Loft, Native Instruments, Splice and Output.

Loops are supplied in either MIDI or Audio file formats such as WAV, REX2, AIFF and MP3. Musicians play loops by triggering the start of the musical sequence by using a MIDI controller such as an Ableton Push or a Native Instruments MASCHINE.

Definitions
"Loops are short sections of tracks (probably between one and four bars in length), which you believe might work being repeated." A loop is not "any sample, but ... specifically a small section of sound that's repeated continuously." Contrast with a one-shot sample.
"A loop is a sample of a performance that has been edited to repeat seamlessly when the audio file is played end to end."
"A drum loop is technically a short recording of multiple drum materials which has been edited to loop seamlessly ( to loop smoothly and continuously), a drum loop repeats until an exact duration is satisfied, for example, to break a single loop to another, you might want to use a drum fill which could also be a seamless loop."

Origins

While repetition is used in the music of all cultures, the first musicians to use loops, as early as 1944, were electroacoustic music pioneers such as Pierre Schaeffer, Halim El-Dabh, Pierre Henry, Edgard Varèse and Karlheinz Stockhausen.  In turn, El-Dabh's music influenced Frank Zappa's use of tape loops in the mid-1960s.

Terry Riley is a seminal composer and performer of the loop- and ostinato-based music who began using tape loops in 1960. For his 1963 piece Music for The Gift he devised a hardware looper that he named the Time Lag Accumulator, consisting of two tape recorders linked together, which he used to loop and manipulate trumpet player Chet Baker and his band. His 1964 composition In C, an early example of what would later be called minimalism, consists of 53 repeated melodic phrases (loops) performed live by an ensemble. "Poppy Nogood and the Phantom Band", the B-side of his influential 1969 album A Rainbow in Curved Air uses tape loops of his electric organ and soprano saxophone to create electronic music that contains surprises as well as hypnotic repetition. 

Another effective use of tape loops was Jamaican dub music in the 1960s. Dub producer King Tubby used tape loops in his productions while improvising with homemade delay units. Another dub producer, Sylvan Morris, developed a slapback echo effect by using both mechanical and handmade tape loops. These techniques were later adopted by hip hop musicians in the 1970s. Grandmaster Flash's turntablism is an early example in hip hop.

The first commercial drum loop was created for the Song “Stayin’ Alive” for the movie Saturday Night Fever by Albhy Galuten and Karl Richardson. It was created by recording two measures of drums from the song “Night Fever” and recording them onto a two-track analog tape which was then fed between the capstan and the pinch roller. Because the loop was about 30 feet long, it was fed out to a 7” plastic reel for ballast which was hung over the arm of a microphone stand before the loop of tape returned to the take-up reel. This same loop was later used by the Bee Gees for the song “More than a Woman” also from the Saturday Night Fever soundtrack. That same loop was also use – though slowed down quite a bit, for the Streisand recording of “Woman in Love” produced by Albhy Galuten, Karl Richardson and Barry Gibb. When Jeff Porcaro of the band TOTO came to work with Galuten and Gibb on a Bee Gees record, he was shown the technique of creating drum loops with analog tape. Porcaro subsequently went back to California where he used the method he had learned to create the drum loop that was used by Toto as the foundation of the song Africa.

The use of pre-recorded, digitally-sampled loops in popular music dates back to Japanese electronic music band Yellow Magic Orchestra, who released one of the first albums to feature mostly samples and loops, 1981's Technodelic. Their approach to sampling was a precursor to the contemporary approach of constructing music by cutting fragments of sounds and looping them using computer technology. The album was produced using Toshiba-EMI's LMD-649 digital PCM sampler, which engineer Kenji Murata custom-built for YMO.

Modern looping

Today, many musicians use digital hardware and software devices to create and modify loops, often in conjunction with various electronic musical effects. A loop can be created by a looper pedal, a device that records the signal from a guitar or other audio source and then plays the recorded passage over and over again. 

In the early 1990s, dedicated digital devices were invented specifically for use in live looping, i.e. loops that are recorded in front of a live audience. 

Many hardware loopers exist, some in rack unit form, but primarily as effect pedals. The discontinued Lexicon JamMan, Gibson Echoplex Digital Pro, Electrix Repeater, and Looperlative LP1 are 19" rack units. The Boomerang "Rang III" Phrase Sampler, DigiTech JamMan, Boss RC-300 and the Electro-Harmonix 2880 are examples of popular pedals. As of December 2015, the following pedals are currently in production: TC Ditto, TC Ditto X2, TC Ditto Mic, TC Ditto Stereo, Boss RC-1, Boss RC-3, Boss RC-30, Boss RC-300 and Boss RC-505.

The musical loop is one of the most important features of video game music. It is also the guiding principle behind devices like the several Chinese Buddhist music boxes that loop chanting of mantras, which in turn were the inspiration of the Buddha machine, an ambient-music generating device. The Jan Linton album "Buddha Machine Music" used these loops along with others created by manually scrolling through C.D.s on a CDJ player.

Loop-based music software

See also
Phase music

References

Sources

 
 
 
 
 
 
 .
 
 
 
 
 
  Archive from 25 November 2012 (accessed 10 June 2014).

Further reading

External links 
 

DJing